= Japanese singles chart =

Japanese singles chart may refer to:

- Oricon Singles Chart, the physical singles chart of Oricon
- Billboard Japan Hot 100, the main music chart of Billboard Japan
